GSC 02652-01324 is an orange dwarf main sequence star approximately 523 light-years away in the constellation of Lyra (the Lyre).

Planetary system
In 2004 the extrasolar planet TrES-1b was found to be orbiting this star by the Trans-Atlantic Exoplanet Survey using the transit method. The planet was detected crossing its parent star using a small  telescope. The discovery was confirmed by the Keck Observatory using the radial velocity method, allowing its mass to be determined.

Additional planets in the systems are suspected dut to transit timing variations of TrES-1b.

See also
 HD 209458
 51 Pegasi

References

External links
 

Lyra (constellation)
K-type main-sequence stars
Planetary transit variables
Planetary systems with one confirmed planet
Lyrae, V672